The Z type carriages are an air conditioned steel passenger carriage used on the railways of Victoria, Australia. The carriages were constructed by the Victorian Railways from 1957 for use on intrastate services.

Two major types of carriage were constructed - thirteen AZ first class cars with closely spaced but smaller windows, and twelve BZ second class cars with wider spaced but larger windows (the thirteenth BZ entered service on standard gauge). Carriages were provided with a saloon layout, with 2+2 reversible seating provided, with each row lining up with the windows. First class was provided with more legroom than second. An internal partition existed between the two ends of the saloon, but was removed in later years. A single twinette sleeping car was also built in a Z type body shell, entering service in 1963; it had 20 berths.

A number of carriages were placed onto standard gauge bogies from 1962 for use on interstate trains such as the Spirit of Progress. With the end of these trains in the 1980s they were placed back onto the broad gauge. During this time a number of AZ type carriages were provided with conductors work stations / compartments and recoded to ACZ at this time.

The Z type cars were made redundant by the early 1990s with the introduction of the Sprinter railcars, most Z Sets were broken up, with the formation of West Coast Railway effective Sunday 19 September 1993 to run Melbourne ~ Geelong ~ Warrnambool Passenger Rail Services under contract to the Victorian Governments Dept. of Transport, Carriages: ACZ's: 252, 255, 257 & BZ's: 267, 269, 270 were obtained by West Coast Railway. After the demise of WCR, V/Line reacquired ACZ 252, ACZ 257 & BZ267, with preservation groups such as R707 Operations acquiring ACZ 255 & BZ 270 & Steamrail Victoria acquiring BZ 269.

The cars still with V/Line were refurbished from 1995, being provided with 2+3 seating in the N type carriage style, with some carriages also receiving wider doors and toilets with wheelchair access. Today only a handful of Z type carriages remain in unaltered form, these being ACZ255 & BZ270 with R707 Operations.

V/Line maintains ACZ 257 (now reclassed as  BCZ 257 ~ an economy class carriage, with the WCR 2001-era upgraded conductors work station / compartment) now reversed to be at the West End, while still maintaining its Z type interior as modified & refurbished by WCR in there DDA-compliance upgrade of 2001. 

(As part of these upgrades for DDA-Complience by WCR: ACZ's 252 & 257 were permanently turned, with the old east end {that once formerly housed the 1980s-era fitted larger conductors work station / compartments} being subsequently removed & replaced with a DDA-complement disabled toilet, similar to that fitted to V/Line BZN Carriages, this was hence renamed the new west end of the carriage. The old west end, that once housed the former toilet and washroom compartments divided by the central aisle & saloon entry} was subsequently removed & replaced with a new smaller conductors work station / compartment and hence renamed the new east end of the carriage.)

The remaining Z type carriages in the V/Line fleet were temporarily removed from service in January 2013 due to cracking occurring in the bogies. The carriages have gradually been returned to service, and as at mid December 2016, only BTN253, BTN254, BZN258, BZN262 and BTN268 were out of service.

History

Services
For much of their life, the Z cars operated as Z sets, however, in the early 1990s most sets were broken up, with carriages merged into N sets. They thus currently run on services mixed with Z sets. Until 2010, there was one set still branded as a Z set, set SZ7, however, this set was actually mostly made up of S cars. 

The Z type cars run on long-distance services to Bairnsdale, Albury, Shepparton, Swan Hill and Warrnambool, as well as some interurban services. In the past, they also operated on other long-distance and interurban runs. 

With the introduction of more V/locity trains, the Z cars will be withdrawn from all remaining services, except for Swan Hill, where it is unknown when locomotive-hauled trains will be replaced.

Design
The new carriages were essentially a saloon version of the earlier S-car design, using the most modern amendments to that plan and adjusted for a saloon interior rather than compartments. Each carriage has a body length of 71ft 6in, with diaphragms either end extending to 75ft when loose, compressing by 2in per end when coupled. The shell is 13ft 2¹¹⁄₁₆in from rail height when loaded, and 9ft 9in wide plus external handrails. Couplers are 2ft 11in above rail height on flat track, and the bogies are spaced at 53ft centres, and 9ft 3in from the ends of the body. Axles are spaced 8ft apart within the bogies, and the wheels are 3ft 0¼in diameter.

The first S and O/J type carriages were designed with full-width diaphragms in mind, using steel plates to give the impression of a single-unit train. 1AZ had curved ends reminiscent of this outline, while 2AZ, 1BZ and 2BZ had flat ends. The remainder of the class was built with chamfered edges to the body, and all units had exposed rubber diaphragms fitted from new. The walkway through the diaphragms is 2ft 4in wide. Externally the only difference between the first and second class carriages, other than markings indicating as such, was the number and size of windows. Both types had two small windows, one either end per side, for the washroom and toilet. Between those, first class cars had a set of five then a set of seven short windows, while second class cars have three then five longer windows; the gap between window 3 and window 4 is hardly noticeable compared to the gap between 5 and 6 on the first class carriages.

Additionally, the first three vehicles of each class featured a line of rivets along the carriage frame. These are thought to be present because those carriage frames had originally been earmarked for future S type carriage builds.

Plumbing
The earlier cars in each set had a single tank for 140 gallons of cold water, and small air-intake panels either side of the end-of-carriage diaphragms. Later cars had two, much larger air intakes on one side only of each diaphragm, and tanks for 280 gallons of cold water; and in some cases an additional tank for 20 gallons of hot water.

Electrical Systems
All the broad gauge cars except AZ2, BZ1 and BZ2 were powered via Hypoid motor-generator sets, with a gear ratio of 3.47:1 generating 17 kW. The remaining three cars used an alternative system with a 2:57 gear ratio, driving a separate generator set to provide the same 17 kW. The standard gauge cars were only powered by an external supply of 3-phase 415 VAC at 50 Hz. When AZ3 and BZ3 operated on standard gauge they could be powered by their Hypoid systems, or if that was disconnected they could also use the head-end power of the train consist. Some cars were fitted with batteries for emergency power supply - 1VBK and 2VBK had 120 V batteries each, and 1VAM had a bank of batteries providing 48 V.

Air conditioning was built into the roof of the cars, with fresh air ducts either end of the cars and the distribution ducting formed by the ceiling design. Each car was also fitted with a heating system; between the air and in-floor heaters the total load was between 9000 to 10,500W depending on the car.

Details

Sitting cars AZ, BZ & BZS, VBK & VFK

When entering the carriage from a platform, passengers first walk through the vestibule area with swing doors to adjacent carriages through diaphragms. On the opposite side there are three doors; facing the centre of the carriage, the left is for the washroom, the centre to the saloon area and the right to the toilet. The men's washroom includes a power outlet supplying 230vAC. The main saloon compartment was originally divided into two sections, with a partition between. The end adjacent to the men's toilets was for smoking passengers and called the No.1 End, while the end adjacent to the ladies' toilet was for non-smoking passengers and called the No.2 End. All seat pairs were 3ft 8in over armrests and could rotate and recline with footrests provided; and reading lights were provided at least on the first class standard gauge cars. The centre aisle is around 1ft 7½in wide, and illuminated with fluorescent lights. A public address system is fitted for announcements.

First class carriages were fitted with one pair of seats per window, to give 20 seats in the No.1/smoking end and 28 in the No.2/non-smoking end; spacing was a little over 4ft.

Second class carriages were similar, but with six rows of four seats in the No.1/smoking end behind three windows, and ten rows of four seats in the No.2/non-smoking end behind five windows. Total capacity was 64.

The first two cars of each class were fitted with timber veneer panels internally. Cars AZ3 and BZ3 were modified to allow quick conversion to standard gauge if needed, and to match most of the stock on the Sydney run they were fitted with laminex interiors in lieu. Later cars repeated this alteration.

From the mid 1960s the cars on broad gauge had their layouts modified; the first class carriage seats were respaced drastically to give 56 seats - 24 in the No.1/smoking end and 32 in the No.2/non-smoking end, with spacing reduced to about 3ft 10in. The changes to the second class cars were far more minor, as the change from 64 to 68 seats only required one additional row of seats in line with the smoking/non-smoking partition, which was modified to suit. When these modifications were completed, the tare weight of the cars increased to 48t 14c 1Q 0L. The change occurred later on the standard gauge carriages, some not gaining the extra seats until the mid 1990s when they were returned to broad gauge. Smoking was banned on all trains in Victoria in June 2006.

From the 1980s the cars were gradually converted and upgraded to suit the requirements of the New Deal, and the fleet was renumbered as part of that project to match the new reservations and rolling stock management systems. Cars 1-8AZ took on numbers 251-258; cars VBK1-5 became 262, 260, 261, 259 and 263 respectively; cars 1-7BZ were renumbered 264-270, and cars 1-6VFK changed to 271-276. Most cars were modified and some reclassified during the upgrade process, with 1-8AZ, for example, becoming ACZ. VBK263 spent nearly a year operating on the broad gauge system as AZ263 before its conductor compartment was fitted.

When the six standard gauge VFK cars were converted to broad gauge in the 1990s, they were given the code BZS to indicate that they were ex-Standard Gauge, with 64 seats matching the capacity of a typical BS steel carriage. Cars 271 and 275 were the first to transfer across, in 1990, and the other four were shifted in 1992 in preparation for the replacement of the Melbourne/Sydney Express with an XPT consist. Between 1995-1997 these six cars were refitted internally, with a larger door at one end and seats respaced, to provide sitting for 76 passengers and a parking space for one wheelchair. The new format was called BZN, and the cars were allocated to N sets.

Of the seven BZ carriages, three were sold to West Coast Railway in 1995 for use on their Warrnambool route - 267, 269 and 270. The remaining four - 264, 265, 266 and 268 - were retained by V/Line Passenger. In 1996 BZ265 was converted to the BZN format, matching the changes applied to the six ex-standard gauge carriages; BZ266 followed in 1998. In 1999 the other two were modified to a different format, known as BTN. This had been applied to BCZ263 in the previous year, and used the carriage shell with a new interior identical to that of the BN cars, with 88 seats in a 2+3 format and no special functions. When West Coast Railway's stock was sold off in 2004, V/Line re-acquired BZ267, and in 2007 it was also converted to the BZN format. BZ269 and BZ270 were passed to heritage societies, Steamrail Victoria and 707 Operations (with ACZ255) respectively. BZ270 has been repainted in 707's livery of red with silver, but otherwise is largely unchanged since the extra four seats were added. BZ269 was stripped by Steamrail, renumbered BZ6 and named Hobsons Bay, and now operates as a function car with a bar serving drinks, but otherwise a large open space with no seating provided.

ACZ 1st Class & Conductor cars

Following the introduction of the New Deal from 1981, the Z fleet carriages were modified and upgraded to suit the new timetable requirements. The fleet was mixed with the S type carriage group, and the cars were formed into three, four or five carriage sets for long-distance running. Each set used an ACZ car at what would be the southern/eastern end at Spencer Street Station, in lieu of the earlier practice of vans both ends or shifting the independent guard's van to the opposite end of the train at the end of each run. This allowed much faster turnarounds at termini. Initially, eight ACZ cars were converted from 1AZ through 8AZ, completed by the end of 1985 at Bendigo Workshops for around $57,800 each.

Two further cars were transferred from the standard gauge fleet in 1986, to provide ten ACZ-BRS sets to mix with BZ and BS economy sitting cars. A typical regional consist at the time would have been BS-BZ-BRS-ACZ, plus or minus a BS car depending on requirements. The final three standard gauge VBK cars were converted to broad gauge ACZ in 1990-1991, though all had been renumbered to match the New Deal system by 1987.

The modified ACZ cars had the toilets and four seats removed from the east end, and that space was utilised as the new guard's compartment to match that provided in the new ACN cars. This reduced their sitting capacity from 56 to 52 passengers, with the expectation that most luggage would be stored in an attached luggage van of the D series. Periscopes were fitted to allow guards to check signals, but as the guards were phased out the small compartment was handed over to conductors as an office area, and the periscopes were removed.

Introduction of the Sprinter fleet from 1993 rendered some of the regional loco-hauled carriage sets obsolete, so the vehicles were withdrawn and stored, typically at Ballarat or Bendigo workshops; and three (252, 255, 257) were sold to West Coast Railway when that company gained operational accreditation. ACZ260 was supposed to be included in the sale but was damaged a few days before the handover; it had been stored at Newport Workshops for 22 years, before rebuilt by V/line in 2017-18 to become a power van for the Albury standard gauge service.

As patronage increased approaching the new millennium they were gradually called back into service, and converted to provide additional Economy seating capacity. In 1995-1996, cars 251, 253, 254, 258, 261 and 263 were all returned to service, reclassed BCZ for economy passengers. Many of these were rotated and attached to the west end of existing sets, rather than reforming their previous consists, to provide a temporary facility for wheelchair storage following passage of the Disability Discrimination Act in 1992. ACZ cars 259 and 262 were retained in service as loose 1st class carriages, for attaching to special consists as required; and ACZ256 was stored at Bendigo pending restoration and conversion to BCZ when the funding for the program ran out, so it was stored indefinitely. It was finally completed and re-entered service in 2000, following damage to some of the Sprinter vehicles and a jump in patronage.

In 2003 cars 251, 253 and 254 were converted to the new BTN format, with 88 seats arranged in 2+3, matching the capacity of the BN sitting carriages; and 256, 258 and 261 were converted to BZN, a modification of the BCZ arrangement with 76 economy seats in lieu of 52 1st class seats. The six cars were paired, then attached to three N type carriage sets. That left ACZ259, ACZ262 and BCZ263 with V/Line Passenger. When West Coast Railway folded in 2004, V/Line re-purchased cars ACZ252 and ACZ257. In 2006-2007, ACZ257, ACZ259 and ACZ262 were reclassed BCZ (to go with BCZ263), though no internal changes were applied at the time, and ACZ252 was converted to BZN252. BCZ262 was converted to the BZN format in 2008, and BCZ259 to BTN259 followed in 2013, leaving only BCZ257; this vehicle was used to form set Z57 when additional capacity was required on the Geelong line, and in more recent times it has been utilised as a secondary luggage storage area, attached to one of the regular N sets, often rostered to run to Swan Hill where the reduced capacity is manageable, and the increased comfort appreciated.

BZN & BTN conversions

The Z sets were gradually dissolved from the mid-1990s, and the cars reallocated to N carriage sets. From 1995-1998 eight cars were converted to BZN, with some seats removed and a wider doorway fitted to make the cars wheelchair-accessible; and in 1998-1999 a further three cars were converted to a more dense seating arrangement, with 88 seats provided in the same layout as the BN carriages. A further three cars of each type were created in 2003, followed by 252 and 267 to BZN in 2007, 262 in 2008 and 259 in 2013.

Composite Sleeping Car
The composite sitting/sleeping car, VAM1, was built with 10 evenly-spaced windows per side, plus a closer window and a door at the No.2 end. Access to the car was via the doors at the No.2 end, or via coupled carriages and the diaphragms linking them to VAM1. The ten windows each represented a single compartment. The first and second compartments at the No.1 end were fitted with bench seats for four people each, while the other eight compartments were fitted with three-person seats divisible with retractable armrests. All seats could fold down to form a bed, and above that was a second bed, giving capacity for up to 20 sleeping passengers or up to 24 first-class and 8 second-class passengers. Generally speaking only the first four compartments at the No.1 end were used for sitting passengers, and the remaining six were used exclusively for sleeping passengers. Partially because of this, the public address system was only wired to the four compartments at the No.1 end, and not the other six. Each compartment also had its own cupboard, shower, toilet, card table and wardrobe. The interior was sheathed with laminex panels.

At the No.2 end a small curtained-off area was reserved for the carriage conductor, with a seat to work at. Weight of the car was 51 tons 13 cwt. Water capacity was 280 gallons of cold water, plus 75 gallons of hot water for the showers. The car was fitted with marker lights, backup lamp brackets and tail discs at both ends, allowing it to trail any train. Notably, even though the car would only normally trail trains in New South Wales, the end-of-train marker was a Victorian Railways disc rather than a New South Wales Railways triangle.

The car now is under the care of Seymour Railway Heritage Centre and was restored to service in 2016.

PZ Power Van
ACZ260 has been modified and reclassed as power van PZ260, as of 17-Jan-2018. It will be converted to standard gauge for use on the Albury line.

In Service

Individual cars

Sitting cars
Initially, AZ and BZ cars were allocated to long-distance passenger trains in Victoria. Cars would be attached to The Vinelander for Mildura, The Gippslander to Bairnsdale, the Great Northern to Swan Hill and also to Albury. If additional cars were available after that, they would be allocated to Horsham and/or Dimboola runs, which may have displaced an S type carriage or E type carriage for the runs to Warrnambool and Yarram.

Standard Gauge cars
When the standard gauge line to Albury was opened for passenger traffic, the Victorian Railways planned to convert five each of the AZ and BZ class carriages to standard gauge, to provide extra sitting capacity. This was in conjunction with a handful of S type carriages. The five AZ carriages, 9AZ to 13AZ, were converted in the last quarter of 1961, recoded and stored until required for the opening of the new line. They were followed by conversions of BZ cars 9-12, which were similarly stored. At this time the thirteenth BZ-type shell was still under construction and it caught fire on the production line, so 8BZ was quickly modified and was made available for standard gauge service in February 1962. The ten cars were allocated standard gauge codes of VBK 4, 2, 3, 1, 5 and VFK 2, 3, 4, 1 and 6. When 13BZ was completed it was immediately placed on standard gauge as VFK5.

The codes followed NSW carriage code convention, with V indicating Victorian stock, B and F indicating first and second class respectively, and K being a spare third letter to indicate the type. (Incidentally, the class "K" was later used for the Australian National Railways 500/600/700 series passenger carriages leased by V/Line.)

Cars 3AZ and 3BZ were fitted with extra equipment allowing a fast conversion to standard gauge if additional seating capacity was required on the Sydney run, and the extra capacity could be freed from the broad gauge system.

Sleeping car
VAM1, a Z-type sleeping and sitting car, entered service on the standard gauge in 1963. This car attached to the rear of the Spirit of Progress and was detached at Goulburn, then taken by a separate train to Canberra. When the car was returned to broad gauge on 25 October 1983, it was classed SZ287.

Carriage sets
Operation of fixed carriage sets was not introduced until 1981, with the New Deal reforms of passenger rail operations and the introduction of the N type carriages. Most of the Z cars was placed into sets made up of an ACZ carriage, BRS snack car carriage, and between one and three other BS and BZ carriages.

7BZ was the first to be renumbered to the new scheme, becoming BZ270 on 21 November 1983. 2VBK was similarly renumbered to VBK260 on 20 December 1983, and 3VBK to VBK261 on 5 April 1984.

In 1984-5 the eight AZ cars had conductor compartments added, and were reclassed as ACZ 251-258, followed by ACZ260 and 262 ex VBK cars 2 and 4 in 1986. 1990-1991 saw the three remaining VBK cars transferred to broad gauge, as ACZ259 (ex VBK259), ACZ261 (ex VBK261) and AZ263 (ex VBK263); the latter was converted to ACZ within a year.

Other cars were simply recoded, with VAM1 moving to broad gauge and being reclassed SZ287, while the seven broad gauge and six standard gauge economy carriages were renumbered 264-276 ex 1BZ-7BZ, VFK1-VFK6.

In the early 1990s the six VFK cars were returned to broad gauge and refitted internally with a better type of seating, being coded BZS to differentiate them from the existing BZ class. This was around the time the Riverina XPT was extended to Melbourne.

From 1993 some of the Z sets were broken up as the Sprinter railcars arrived, with only two five-car sets remaining: VZ1 and VZ2. The loose cars were utilised as additional cars in the N type sets, with the last Z set being broken up in 2006. A number of loose ACZ / BCZ carriages remain, that can be attached to N type sets.

When West Coast Railway started operating their own trains around 1995, they purchased a handful of carriages from V/Line. Those included ACZ252, 255 and 257, and BZ 267, 269 and 270. ACZ260 was another intended purchase but it had been damaged while on lease to West Coast Railway, before the purchase could occur, so V/Line substituted one of the other three ACZ coaches.

From the early 2000s the Z cars, both ACZ and BZ/BZS, were fitted with upgraded seating to match the N type interiors. Cars rebuilt like this were coded BZN or BTN, depending on whether they were intended to be used as fourth or fifth carriages as attached to an N set.

In December 2008, a N carriage (ACN21) was withdrawn from service to be converted to SG to run on the upgraded Albury-Wodonga line. Before withdrawal this carriage was in N set SN7, along with the BS cars. Because of ACN21's withdrawal, a Z carriage was introduced into the set permanently. The 5 BS cars and the Z car (BCZ257) were joined into a set coded Z57, as a replacement for SN7.

In late 2014, BCZ257 was noted as being semi-permanently coupled to N set VN17 as the fourth carriage. It tends to run on Swan Hill and Bairnsdale services.

Z cars have gradually been returning to service as more bogies are reconditioned. On Thursday 22 September 2016 a test train ran from Melbourne to Geelong and back, with two locomotives, set N11 at the west end and BZN cars 271, 267, 274 and 252.

Set history
As part of the 1983 New Deal, the steel country passenger rollingstock was organised into sets. The Z sets were numbered 51 to 63, after the ACZ carriages providing the conductor accommodation. However, the sets contained a mixture of S and Z type carriages.

When West Coast Railway purchased cars from V/Line to operate their Warrnambool service, they acquired ACZ252, ACZ255, ACZ257, BZ267, BZ269 and BZ270. Initially the V/Line logos were covered with white "W" decals, and after the sale was completed on 9 April 1995, the cars were repainted into that company's blue scheme.

Note: Colours are representative only, and do not directly correlate to liveries worn in the era.

After the car identities, "T" indicates through-cabled for head end power; H indicates that the car requires head end power for lighting and air conditioning but is fitted with batteries, and H indicates same without batteries.

Unlike the H and N sets, the Z sets were usually labelled just as Z with the number, regardless of the number of cars in the set. FZ (four car) and VZ (five car) sets were only identified as such from about 2004, when the sets became more fixed.

As the Z sets were dissolved, their carriages were converted to BZN or BTN cars for inclusion in N sets. As at July 1997, there were seven FN type sets with a BZN included in their consist, plus two VN sets with a BZ and BCZ, and one Z set, Z59, as ACZ259-BZ-BS-BS-BCZ51H (The BS cars were BS216 and BS217). Additionally, one ACZ and three BCZ cars were spares, not allocated to active sets.

Current Status
By current codes. 251-263 are ex-AZ/ACZ/VBK, 264-276 are ex-BZ/VFK, 287 is ex-SZ/VAM.

V/Line fleet
As at September 2015, 22 remained in service with V/Line. Of those, nine were out of service awaiting new bogie frames. Another four had been restored to service by mid December 2016.

In service, V/Line Passenger: BTN 251, 253, 259, 263; BZN 252, 256, 261, 265, 267, 271-276, BCZ 257, PZ 260
Under repair, V/Line Passenger: BTN 254, 264 & 268; BZN 258, 262 & 266

The allocation as at early 2018 is, or will be:

Original AZ carriages
BTN251 - Set VN10 from January 2017.
Previous allocations: Z59 (5-car) as BCZ251H at 1997-04-09
BZN252 - Set FN13 from January 2017.
Previous allocations: Set FN10 from September 2016.
BTN253 - Set VN18 from January 2017.
Previous allocations: Set VN17. Was a loose car (BCZ253T) at 1997-04-09
BTN254 - Stored at Newport Workshops, awaiting new bogies. Will proceed to set VN14.
Previous allocations: FN18 circa 2008-2012; FN3 circa 2007; N17 (5-car) as BCZ254H at 1997-04-09
BZN256 - Set VN3 (formerly FN3).
Previous allocations: x
BCZ257 - Set VN19 from January 2017.
Previous allocations: Set FN9 from January 2016. Was coupled to FN6 for a time, but not officially part of the consist.
BZN258 - Stored at Newport Workshops, awaiting new bogies. Will proceed to set VN14.
Previous allocations: VN17 circa 2001-2015; Z59 (5-car) as BCZ258H at 1997-04-09
BTN259 - Set VN6 from January 2017.
Previous allocations: Set VN12. Z59 (5-car) as ACZ259H at 1997-04-09
ACZ260 - Modified and reclassed as PZ260
Previous allocations: x
BZN261 - Set VN17
Previous allocations: Set FN3, N4 (5-car) as BCZ261H at 1997-04-09 West end was damaged in shunting side-swipe in morning of Wednesday 20 August 1997.
BZN262 - Stored at Newport Workshops, awaiting new bogies. Will proceed to set VN10.
Previous allocations: FN3 from 2008, and FN5 circa 2010. Was a loose car (ACZ262H) at 1997-04-09
BTN263 - Set VN17
Previous allocations: Set FN14. FN12 as BCZ263H at 1997-04-09

Original BZ carriages
BTN264 - Set VN3.
Previous allocations: Set FN14, N4 (5-car) as BZ264H at 1997-04-09
BZN265 - Set FN9.
Previous allocations: Set FN19. Was a loose car (BZN265H) at 1997-04-09
BZN266 - Set VN5 (was FN5).
Previous allocations: N17 (5-car) as BZ266H at 1997-04-09
BZN267 -  Set FN4
Previous allocations: Set FN14 late 2016. Set FN4 from 2009.
BTN268 - Workshops. Will go to VN11.
Previous allocations: Set FN13. Set FN10 temporarily in August 2016.
BZN271H - Set VN19.
Previous allocations: Set FN11 from 2013. FN1 at 1997-04-09
BZN272H - Set VN12.
Previous allocations: FN10 circa 1995; N9 (4-car) at 1997-04-09
BZN273H - Set VN10.
Previous allocations: Set FN19 in 2016, FN15 at 1997-04-09
BZN274H - Set VN6 (was FN6).
Previous allocations: Was a loose car (BZN274H) at 1997-04-09
BZN275H - Set FN18 from 2016.
Previous allocations: FN19 circa 1995 through 1997.
BZN276H - Set VN11.
Previous allocations: Set VN17 2016, FN10 circa 1995-1997, also in 2007 and 2016 (temporarily withdrawn during bogie issues).
Sets SN1, SN15, SN16 and soon SN8 are on standard gauge, exclusively operating with N type carriages; and sets N2 and N7 were dissolved to provide carriages to form those.

Preserved
 In service, 707 Operations, Newport West Block: ACZ255, BZ270
 In service, Seymour Railway Heritage Centre: VAM1 (SZ287)
 In service, Steamrail, Newport West Block: BZ269 "Hobsons Bay"

Model railways

Speciality Scale Models
In the 1990s, Speciality Scale Models released Z type carriage kits, with whitemetal and brass components. After a time the kits were found to not sell as well as was hoped, so DJH was commissioned to build the kits and sell them as ready-to-run products, singly or in sets. The range included blue/gold AZ, BZ, VFK and VBK; and V/Line ACZ and BZ. At least one of the four-car sets included BS212.

Dogspike Models
In 2012, Dogspike Models produced a limited number of Z type carriages, including AZ and ACZ/BCZ types in various liveries. The cars are reasonably detailed externally, but with no interior detail. The run was intended to include AZ, BZ and ACZ cars, in VR Blue and Gold, VicRail "Teacup", V/Line, West Coast Railway orange and West Coast Railway blue. Intended prices were $160 for one, $275 for two or $360 for three cars.

The company had to slow manufacturing when the bogie supply dried up.

Powerline
In 2014, Powerline announced an intention to produce a run of plastic, ready-to-run Z-type carriages sometime after the then-underway production of the S-type carriages. The first test units were displayed at Sandown Racecourse during the Labor Day weekend exhibition in 2019, and the models are expected to be released in late 2019 or early 2020.

Most of the sitting fleet (4-13AZ, 4-11BZ, 1-4VBK and 1-4VFK) will be released in VR blue, along with one vehicle (VBK260) in VicRail Teacup and three units (BZ270, VBK261 and VBK263) in V/Line orange with silver.

In the V/Line orange, white and green livery, 12 units are expected to be released - ACZ255, 256, 257 and 259, BCZ258, 261 and 263, and BZS271 and 272, plus VBK259 for the standard gauge. In the V/Line Passenger MkI scheme (red, with white and blue and the logo in all-capitals), ACZ258, BCZ256, BTN263, BTN264, BZN273 and BZN274 are being released, and in the current grey MkIV scheme, BZN271, BZN262 and BTN253 are listed on the provisional order form. However, this is subject to change; notably, BTN264 was renumbered ex 1BZ, which is not being offered in any other variant.

Five of the six West Coast Railway vehicles - all bar ACZ252 - are being released, plus BZS269 in the Steamrail Victoria scheme along with ACZ255 and BZ270 in 707 Operations' red livery.

Powerline has announced that a second production run will include VR Blue BZ Cars marked with "Economy" rather than "Second".

Trainbuilder

First run
The first run of models featured a full brass body preassembled and painted, with onboard lighting included. Three Z-type carriages were released as part of the 1960s-era Spirit of Progress series, with a VFK and a VBK included in the boxed set of ten (which retailed at $5,500.00), and a further two, 4VBK and 1VFK, included in an expansion pack at $1,100.00.

Additional cars were available, as pairs 8AZ and 6BZ or 5AZ and 7BZ for $1,100.00; and in sets with other classes of carriages mixed in, 6AZ in VR blue or VicRail orange; 262ACZ in grey; or ACZ262 and BZ267 in V/Line orange. Individually, the West Coast Railway cars ACZ255 and BZ267, and the V/Line Passenger cars BZ254(sic) and ACZ259 for $550.00 each.

Second run
Delivered in mid-2015, Trainbuilder released a second run of the brass models, this time removing the internal lighting features in order to keep the price per carriage down to only $395.00 each.

This second run included 4-8AZ and 4-8BZ (marked Economy) in Victorian Railways blue and gold, as well as 252-254ACZ, 251BCZ and 264-267BZ in V/Line Orange.

References

Further reading
V/Linecars.com: VZ sets
V/Linecars.com: ACZ/BCZ cars
V/Linecars.com: BZ cars
V/Linecars.com: BZN cars
V/Linecars.com: BTN cars
Peter J Vincent: AZ cars
Peter J Vincent: ACZ cars
Peter J Vincent: BCZ cars
Peter J Vincent: VBK cars
Peter J Vincent: BZ cars
Peter J Vincent: VFK cars
Peter J Vincent: BZS cars
Peter J Vincent: BZN cars
Peter J Vincent: VAM / SZ car

Victorian Railways carriages